The following army units were involved in the Battle of Droop Mountain on November 6, 1863, near Hillsboro, West Virginia, in the American Civil War. Hillsboro, spelled "Hillsborough" on some maps from that century, is located in the mountainous terrain of Pocahontas County, West Virginia. A Union brigade commanded by Brigadier General William W. Averell defeated a smaller Confederate force commanded by Brigadier General John Echols and Colonel William L. "Mudwall" Jackson. A second Union force commanded by Brigadier General Alfred N. Duffié, tried to prevent the Confederate retreat, but did not engage at Droop Mountain. Aware of Duffié's troops, Confederate forces escaped before he arrived.

The Union Army units, and their commanders, are listed first. The Confederate Army units, and their commanders, follow. Many of the men on both sides were from West Virginia. In one case, Confederate Captain James McNeil of the 22nd Virginia Infantry Regiment was captured by the 3rd West Virginia Mounted Infantry—the regiment of McNeil's half brother, Private Alfred McKeever. Not shown is the Confederate force commanded by Brigadier General John D. Imboden, which did not arrive at Droop Mountain in time for the battle and unsuccessfully pursued Averell in the days after the battle.

Abbreviations used

Military rank
 BG = Brigadier General
 Col = Colonel
 Ltc = Lieutenant Colonel
 Maj = Major
 Cpt = Captain
 Lt = 1st Lieutenant

 Pvt = Private

Other
 w  = wounded
 k  = killed

Union Army Department of West Virginia

Fourth Separate Brigade
BG William W. Averell
Lt Jacob H. Mork, Acting Assistant Adjutant General
Lt John Rodgers Meigs, Engineer and Acting Aide-de-Camp
Lt Alexander J. Pentecost, Acting Quartermaster
Pvt Francis S. Reader, clerk

Approximately 3,900 men in brigade.

Duffié's Brigade, Scammon's 3rd Division
BG Alfred N. Duffié
Cpt Alexander H. Rictor, acting inspector general

{| style="align:left; margin-left:1em"
!bgcolor="#99ccff"|Principal Union commanders
|-
|

Confederate Department of Western Virginia and Tennessee
BG John Echols
 Maj George McKendree, brigade quartermaster
 Cpt R. H. Catlett, staff
 Cpt W. R. Preston, staff
 Echols' Brigade numbered about 1,558 only seven days before the Battle of Droop Mountain, and he claimed he had no more than 1,700 men directly under his command.

{| style="align:left; margin-left:1em"
!bgcolor="#99ccff"|Principal Confederate commanders
|-
|

Notes

Citations

References

American Civil War orders of battle